Milorad Korać (born 10 March 1969) is a Serbian football goalkeeping manager and former player (goalkeeper).

Playing career

Club career
Korać played for several clubs, including Sloboda Užice, Bečej, Obilić, Erzurumspor and Kocaelispor in Turkey and FK Hajduk Beograd. He spent his last two seasons as goalkeeper of Khazar Lankaran from Azerbaijan.

International career
He has one unofficial cap for the FR Yugoslavia national football team and was a participant at the 2000 UEFA European Championship. He was a last-minute call-up replacing Aleksandar Kocić who broke a toe while showering after the last practice prior to the tournament.

Coaching career
He was a goalkeeper coach for Panserraikos F.C. while they were in the Super League Greece.

References

External links
 Profile at Fcobilic.tripod.com

1969 births
Living people
People from Požega, Serbia
Serbian footballers
Association football goalkeepers
UEFA Euro 2000 players
Serbian football managers
FK Sloboda Užice players
OFK Bečej 1918 players
FK Obilić players
FK Hajduk Beograd players
Kocaelispor footballers
Erzurumspor footballers
Expatriate footballers in Azerbaijan
Expatriate footballers in Turkey
Khazar Lankaran FK players
Serbia and Montenegro expatriate sportspeople in Azerbaijan
Serbia and Montenegro expatriate sportspeople in Turkey
Serbia and Montenegro expatriate footballers
Serbia and Montenegro footballers